This is the list of Sports venues in Dubai, UAE.

Basketball
 Basketball Hub Dubai

Badminton
Hamdan Sports Complex
Al Nasr Badminton Court
XSA Badminton Training Center
Professional Sports Academy
SIMBR Sports
Dubai Sports World
Cosmos Badminton Academy

Golf
Dubai Desert Golf Classic
Emirates Golf Club
Dubai Creek Golf & Yacht Club
Nad Al Sheba Club
The Montgomerie
The Dunes being planned
DWC Golf city (u/c)
Dubai Golf City (u/c)
Trump Golf estate (u/c)

Multi purpose stadiums
DSC Multi-Purpose Stadium (u/c)
Al-Maktoum Stadium
Al-Rashid Stadium
Zabeel Stadium 
Police Officers Club Stadium
DSC Indoor Arena (u/c)
Coca-Cola Arena (u/c)
Mohammed Bin Rashid Stadium (u/c)
Maktoum Bin Rashid Al Maktoum Stadium

Tennis
Aviation Club Tennis Centre
Aviation Club

Hockey
DSC Hockey Stadium (u/c)

Cricket

 DSC Cricket Stadium
 Dubai Cricket Council Ground No 1
 Dubai Cricket Council Ground No 2
 ICC Academy Ground
 The Sevens Stadium

Horse racing and Rugby
Meydan Racecourse
Dubai Exiles Rugby Ground
The Sevens

Motorsport
Dubai Autodrome

Swimming

Wild Wadi Waterpark swimming pools
Dreamland Aqua Park pools
Jet-skiing 
Al-Boom Diving
Dubai Autodrome
Scuba International
Hamdan Sports Complex
Scuba Shade Diving

Scuba Diving

Scuba Shade
DiveCampus

Ice Rink

Dubai Ice Rink

See also
Dubai Sports City
List of development projects in Dubai

References

Sports venues in Dubai
Sports venues, Dubai
Dubai
sports venues